Kanakh (also known as Gankh) is a village in Dezhgan Rural District, in the Central District of Bandar Lengeh County, Hormozgan Province, Iran. At the 2006 census, its population was 1,490, in 275 families.

References 

Populated places in Bandar Lengeh County